
Year 434 BC was a year of the pre-Julian Roman calendar. At the time, it was known as the Second year of the Consulship of Iullus and Tricostus or the Year of the Consulship of Capitolinus and Praetextatus and the Year of the Tribunate of Cossus, Praetextatus and Capitolinus (or, less frequently, year 320 Ab urbe condita). The denomination 434 BC for this year has been used since the early medieval period, when the Anno Domini calendar era became the prevalent method in Europe for naming years.

Events 
 By place 
 Greece 
 Under the leadership of Pericles, Athens introduces a series of measures (the "Megarian decree") imposing an economic embargo on Megara for violations of land sacred to Demeter. According to the provisions of the decree, Megarian merchants are to be excluded from the market of Athens and the ports in its empire. This ban strangles the Megarian economy and strains the fragile peace between Athens and Sparta, which is allied with Megara.
 Philip, brother of Perdiccas II of Macedon challenges Perdiccas for the throne, and enlists the support of Athens and King Derdas of Elimea. Perdiccas responds by stirring up rebellion in a number of Athenian tribute cities, including Potidaea.
 Anaxagoras is arrested by Pericles' political opponents on a charge of contravening the established dogmas of Athenian religion. It takes Pericles' power of oratory and persuasion to secure his release, and even then, he is fined and forced to retire from Athens to Lampsacus in Ionia.

 By topic 
 Mathematics 
 While in prison, Anaxagoras tries to square the circle with straightedge and compasses.

Births

Deaths 
 Duke Jing of Jin

References